Villa Biscossi (Lombard: La Vìla) is a comune (municipality) in the Province of Pavia in the Italian region Lombardy, located about 50 km southwest of Milan and about 30 km southwest of Pavia. As of 31 December 2004, it had a population of 74 and an area of 5 km².

Villa Biscossi borders the following municipalities: Galliavola, Lomello, Mede, Pieve del Cairo.

Demographic evolution

Gallery

References

Cities and towns in Lombardy